Marek Leszek Deska (born August 24, 1985) is a Polish-Canadian professional baseball player who began his baseball career in Toronto, Ontario, Canada and as of 2007, is playing in the Dutch Major League (Honkbal Hoofdklasse) for Mediamonks RCH.  Upon his first start, which was against Instant Holland Almere '90 on May 20, 2007, Deska became the first player in history to play in the highest Dutch league with a Polish passport.  Deska is a right-handed pitcher and started his professional baseball career with the Toronto Maple Leafs of the Intercounty Major Baseball League.

In 2006, as a rookie in the Intercounty Major Baseball League, Deska acted as a reliever for the Toronto Maple Leafs and posted a 1–2 record with a 3.12 ERA while tallying 19 strikeouts in 17.1 innings of work.

Deska pitched in his first Dutch Major League (Honkbal Hoofdklasse) season in 2007 for RCH Mediamonks who made their first appearance in the top Dutch league in 6 years.  Deska ended the season with a 3.70 ERA and boasted a 3–6 record.  He finished in the top 10 in the league in pitching categories such as innings pitched, complete games and quality starts with 7 while finishing 12th in the league in total strikeouts.  He fell to 2–8, 4.85 in 2008.

Deska has also pitched for the Polish National Baseball Team.  In the 2008 European Championship Qualifiers, Deska allowed two runs and fanned 12 in 9 innings of work for Poland, leading the Prague qualifiers in K's; Poland failed to advance to the 2009 European Championship with a 2–2 record.

Deska is currently a physical education teacher at a catholic high school in Brampton, Ontario, Canada And USA

References

Canadian baseball players
Canadian people of Polish descent
1985 births
Living people
Polish baseball players
Baseball people from Ontario
Sportspeople from Częstochowa
Expatriate baseball players in the Netherlands